André Hueston Mack is an American sommelier and winemaker.

Career
Mack worked for two years in the finance industry before transitioning into the restaurant industry. He started as a dishwasher at Darden Restaurants and left as a corporate service trainer after six years. He then worked at The Palm in San Antonio before working as the founding sommelier at Bohanan's in San Antonio. He later worked at the Thomas Keller restaurants The French Laundry in Yountville, California and Per Se in New York, New York.

In 2007, he founded the company Maison Noir (formerly known as Mouton Noir). Mack leases 13 vineyards in the Willamette Valley in Oregon which produce wine under his popular culture-inspired labels.

In 2019 Mack published 99 Bottles: A Black Sheep's Guide to Life-Changing Wines.

In 2020 Mack opened & Sons in Brooklyn, New York, a wine and ham bar.

Mack's wine lists have been listed in The Huffington Post, The Wall Street Journal, and Black Enterprise.

Awards
In 2003, Mack won the Chaîne des Rôtisseurs Young Sommeliers Competition. In 2007, he received The Network Journal's 40-Under-Forty Achievement Award.

See also
List of wine personalities

References

External links
Maison Noir Wines

1972 births
Living people
Oregon wine
Sommeliers